West Peoria Township is located in Peoria County, Illinois. As of the 2010 census, its population was 4,458 and it contained 2,123 housing units.  West Peoria was the portion of Peoria Township that was left when the City of Peoria Township was formed in 1907.  It has two parts: the northern, most of which also became the city of West Peoria, Illinois in 1993; and the southern, a triangle between Bartonville, Peoria, and the Illinois River, and including part of Bartonville.

Geography

Cities
Bartonville (small portion)
Peoria (part)
West Peoria (mostly)

Demographics

References

External links
City-data.com
Illinois State Archives

Townships in Peoria County, Illinois
Peoria metropolitan area, Illinois
Townships in Illinois